The Ivory Coast rat (Dephomys eburneae) is a species of rodent in the family Muridae.
It is found in Ivory Coast, possibly Ghana, and Liberia.
Its natural habitats are subtropical or tropical moist lowland forest and subtropical or tropical swampland.

References

 Taylor, P. 2004.  Dephomys eburnea.   2006 IUCN Red List of Threatened Species.   Downloaded on 9 July 2007.

Dephomys
Mammals described in 1967
Taxonomy articles created by Polbot